Michael H. Turner (born 16 June 1948) is an English former competitive swimmer who represented Great Britain at the Olympics and World University Games, and England in the Commonwealth Games, during the 1960s.  He competed in freestyle swimming events.

He represented Great Britain at the 1968 Summer Olympics in Mexico City, in the men's 4×100-metre freestyle relay. He also represented England at the 1966 British Empire and Commonwealth Games in Kingston, Jamaica, collecting medals in all three men's team relay events.

See also
 List of Commonwealth Games medallists in swimming (men)

References

English male freestyle swimmers
Olympic swimmers of Great Britain
Swimmers at the 1968 Summer Olympics
Swimmers at the 1966 British Empire and Commonwealth Games
Alumni of the University of Manchester
1948 births
Living people
Commonwealth Games medallists in swimming
Commonwealth Games silver medallists for England
Commonwealth Games bronze medallists for England
Universiade medalists in swimming
Universiade silver medalists for Great Britain
Medallists at the 1966 British Empire and Commonwealth Games